Nguyễn Văn Minh (1929-2006) was a general in the Army of the Republic of Vietnam (ARVN) during the Vietnam War. Minh entered military service during the First Indochina War in 1950 as an airborne officer serving in the French colonial forces. Minh was dispatched to An Giang Province, in the Mekong Delta, and served as provincial chief until Diem's death in 1963. He was sometimes known as "Little Minh" to distinguish him from the much larger (physically) Dương Văn Minh, known as "Big Minh".

In 1964, he became deputy commander of the 21st Division in the IV Corps Tactical Zone. In 1965 Minh was promoted to brigadier general and given command of the division. During the Tet offensive in 1968, he was given the command of the Capital Military District.

Upon the death of the commander of III Corps, Lieutenant General Do Cao Tri during the Cambodian Incursion of 1970, Minh was promoted and became Corps commander. He now held what was the most important South Vietnamese field command in the war. 

In 1971, he commanded his unit during the Battle of Snuol.

Minh managed to convince President Thieu that An Lộc, not Tây Ninh, was the major objective during the third phase of the North Vietnamese Easter Offensive of 1972. He successfully commanded his forces in the city's defense.

References

Army of the Republic of Vietnam generals
South Vietnamese military personnel of the Vietnam War
People of the First Indochina War
1929 births
2006 deaths